The Magic Basket is a musical play written in 1940 for children by Australian composer Alfred Wheeler. The score includes dialogue and fourteen tunes. Action occurs on a single magical moon-scape set. There are twelve speaking parts and additional chorus.

Synopsis
The plot involves a group of children whisked to a magical land in the moon, where they help the Sandman to recover his bag of sleep-dust from the Goblin. The children are transported in a basket, hence the title.

Musical Numbers
 Oh isn't it fun to live in the moon?
 Whatever can we do
 I sweep the sky
 My basket brave and I
 Derry derry down Oh!
 Galloping, galloping up in the sky
 The sandman
 Tippetty tippetty toe
 Goblins bold are we
 If you will be a meddlesome Matty
 The deed is done
 Bong! goes the gong
 One song before we part
 Lullaby

Performances
 1940 Lauriston Girls' School, Melbourne (premiere)
 1940 Wyalong, New South Wales
 1940 Mount Barker, South Australia
 1943 Cloncurry, Queensland
 1943 Adelaide, South Australia
 1944 Benalla, Victoria
 1945 Port Pirie, South Australia
 1945 Newcastle, New South Wales
 1946 Adelaide
 1946 Newcastle, New South Wales
 1946 North Lismore, New South Wales
 1946 Newcastle, New South Wales
 1947 Broken Hill
 1947 Wagga Wagga, New South Wales
 1947 Lismore, New South Wales
 1947 Shepparton, Victoria
 1947 Grafton, New South Wales
 1948 Mackay
 1949 Wyalong, New South Wales
 1949 Southport, Queensland
 1949 Scone, New South Wales
 1950 Nanson, Western Australia
 1950 Hay, New South Wales
 1950 Maddington, Western Australia
 1951 Launceston, Tasmania
 1951 Sunshine, Victoria
 1951 Burnie, Tasmania
 1952 Maryborough, Queensland
 1952 Braidwood, New South Wales
 1952 Adelaide, South Australia 
 1952 Grafton, New South Wales
 1953 Southbrook, Queensland
 1954 Kygole, New South Wales
 1954 Broken Hill, South Australia
 1954 Townsville, Queensland
 1954 Lithgow, New South Wales
 1955 Parramatta Primary School, starring Bob Winley as Mr Moonshine
 1957 Penrith, New South Wales

References

Australian musicals
1940 in Australia
20th-century Australian literature
Australian children's literature
1940 in music